Abel C. Martin (1831-1879), often referred to as A. C. Martin, was an American architect who worked in Boston, Massachusetts during the nineteenth century.

Early life and career
Abel C. Martin was born October 26, 1831 in Stowe, Vermont to Christopher W. and Laura (Camp) Martin. In early life, at the insistence of his father, he learned a trade, but finding the work not to his liking, and chose to study engineering instead. In 1854 he enrolled in the Lawrence Scientific School of Harvard University, graduating in 1856 with the degree of B. S. He then entered the office of Arthur Gilman, a successful Boston architect who was then engaged on the designing of the Back Bay. His engagement on this project left little time for the instruction of the young men in his office, so Martin had to learn quickly. In 1859, he left Gilman to begin his own practice.

He worked alone until 1865, when he formed a partnership with another young architect, Samuel J. F. Thayer. This partnership continued until 1869, though Martin spent much of the year 1867-1868 traveling abroad in Europe. In 1869 both Martin and Thayer returned to private practice.

Martin was, in 1867, one of the founding members of the Boston Society of Architects, and was its first secretary. Martin led the BSA's efforts to regulate building construction in Boston, and in 1870 some of these were passed. In the aftermath of the Great Boston Fire of 1872, Martin was among those questioned as part of an official inquiry by the City of Boston. The reasons he gave for the fire's swift spread were that the practice of supporting wooden floor beams in masonry wall cavities allowed the wood to catch fire as the walls became superheated, and that elaborate wooden mansard roofs presented an easy way for the fire to spread extremely quickly. Furthermore, Martin argued that the unwillingness of the building public to follow building regulations contributed to the spread.

Martin was highly interested in the ventilation of buildings, and wrote extensively on the subject. This led to him being commissioned, in 1872, to design the Brighton Abattoir, the first regulated slaughterhouse in the United States. He also devised a new system of ventilation used in his Park Theatre, opened in 1879, though his death meant he could not apply this system elsewhere.

Martin would continue his practice until his death in 1879. He died on October 29, 1879, several days after being run over by a frightened horse. At the time of his death, he was forty-eight years old.

Personal life
In 1864 Martin married Clara Barnes of Portland, Maine, the daughter of Phinehas Barnes. They had only one child, a daughter born in 1865, who died at the age of two.

Clara Martin was a proponent of women's education, and from the 1870s until her death in 1886 she was principal of the Otis Place School, a girl's preparatory school.

He was buried in Evergreen Cemetery in Portland, where much of his wife's family were also buried.

Legacy
Like Gilman, Martin took on students who aimed to practice architecture. Of these, the most prominent would be Henry F. Starbuck, who was in his office from 1867 to 1872. Additionally, in 1874 Robert Gould Shaw (a cousin of the Civil War officer of the same name) was in his office, though he soon left to join his brother's architectural practice, G. R. & R. G. Shaw.

Martin's First Church in Cambridge is one of his largest surviving works, and has been cited for its quality by writers such as Henry-Russell Hitchcock in his study of H. H. Richardson and his influences, and by Keith N. Morgan in his survey of the architecture of metropolitan Boston.

Architectural works

Notes

References

Architects from Boston
Architects from Vermont
Harvard School of Engineering and Applied Sciences alumni
1831 births
1879 deaths